Yaşma or Yashma may refer to:

Yaşma 
Yeni Yaşma 
İkinci Yaşma